Ruprechtov is a municipality and village in Vyškov District in the South Moravian Region of the Czech Republic. It has about 600 inhabitants.

Geography
It lies in the Drahany Highlands.

History
The first written mention of Ruprechtov is from 1446, when it was part of the Račice estate, owned by the Lords of Kravaře.

Sights
The municipality is known for the Ruprechtov Windmill. This classical Dutch-type windmill was built in 1873 and is a unique technical monument of European importance.

References

External links

Villages in Vyškov District